The Triple Crown of Canoe Racing (French: La Triple Couronne de Canots Long Parcours) is a canoe marathon series consisting of:
 The General Clinton Canoe Regatta: staged Memorial Day on New York's Susquehanna River, a one-day, non-stop 70 mile race from Cooperstown to Bainbridge.
 The Au Sable River Canoe Marathon: a non-stop race from Grayling Charter Township to Oscoda on Michigan's Au Sable River during the last weekend of July.
 La Classique internationale de canots de la Mauricie: staged Labor Day weekend on Quebec's Saint-Maurice River, a three-day race from La Tuque to Trois-Rivières.

Competitors race in USCA C2 canoes. It is a popular spectator event. The competitors maintain a pace of 50 to 80 strokes per minute and the competition is intense. Athletes must complete portages at a running pace.

The triple crown was established in 1992 and recognizes the performances by athletes who compete at all three races.

Champions of The Triple Crown of Canoe Racing

 1992: Serge Corbin, Quebec & Brett Stockton, Michigan
 1993- 1995: Serge Corbin & Solomon Carriere, Saskatchewan
 1996-1999: Serge Corbin
 2000-2003    Serge Corbin & Jeff Kolka, Michigan
 2004 Andrew Triebold, Michigan & Steve Lajoie, Quebec
 2005 Matthew Rimer, Michigan
 2006 Andrew Triebold & Matthew Rimern
 2007 Matthew Rimer
 2008-2013: Andrew Triebold & Steve Lajoie
 2014 Andrew Triebold
 2015 Mathieu Pellerin & Guillaume Blais

References

External links 
 Triple Crown of Canoe Racing YouTube Channel
 The mystique of the Triple Crown of canoe marathon continues, Canoe & Kayak Racing, September/October 2009
 General Clinton Canoe Regatta

Canoeing and kayaking competitions in the United States
Canoeing and kayaking competitions in Canada
Canoe marathon